Otovica is a village in the municipality of Veles, North Macedonia.

Demographics
As of the 2021 census, Otovica had 315 residents with the following ethnic composition:
Macedonians 298
Persons for whom data are taken from administrative sources 14
Others 3

According to the 2002 census, the village had a total of 274 inhabitants. Ethnic groups in the village include:
Macedonians 266
Serbs 4
Others 4

References

External links

Villages in Veles Municipality
Albanian communities in North Macedonia